Łukasz Różycki (born 13 December 1979 in Warsaw, Poland) is a Polish pair skater who competed with Aneta Kowalska. He is married to Finnish skater Alexandra Schauman.

Competitive highlights

Dancing on Ice
In January 2011, Różycki had joined the professional dancers cast for Dancing on Ice. He was paired with Elen Rivas, but they did not qualify for the live shows and were eliminated. In January 2012, Różycki was paired with EastEnders actress, Laila Morse, but due an injury on Morse's rib, the couple were eliminated in 15th place. In January 2014, he was partnered with previous series champion Beth Tweddle. They reached the final and finished third. He returned to the series in its eleventh series in 2019, partnering with actress Didi Conn. He returned for series 12 in 2020, partnered with Trisha Goddard, but they became the first couple to be eliminated. He returned for the 13th series in 2021, partnering with Myleene Klass. They were the first couple to be eliminated, making Różycki the first professional skater on the show to be eliminated first twice in a row.

References

External links

 

Polish male pair skaters
Living people
1979 births
Figure skaters from Warsaw